The compound of six octahedra has two forms. One form is a symmetric arrangement of 6 octahedra, considered as square bipyramid. It is a dual of a special case of the compound of 6 cubes with rotational freedom.

Another form is a dual of another compound of six cubes.

See also
Compound of three octahedra
Compound of five octahedra
Compound of four octahedra
Compound of six cubes

References 

 Octahedron6-Compound
Polyhedral compounds